Randolph Silliman Bourne (May 30, 1886 – December 22, 1918) was a progressive writer and intellectual born in Bloomfield, New Jersey, and a graduate of Columbia University. He is considered to be a spokesman for the young radicals living during World War I. His articles appeared in journals including The Seven Arts and The New Republic. Bourne is best known for his essays, especially his unfinished work "The State," discovered after he died. From this essay (which was published posthumously and included in Untimely Papers) comes the phrase  "war is the health of the state" which laments the success of governments in  arrogating authority and resources during conflicts.

Life and works

Bourne's face was deformed at birth by misused forceps and the umbilical cord was coiled round his left ear, leaving it permanently damaged and misshapen. At age four, he suffered tuberculosis of the spine, resulting in stunted growth and a hunched back. He chronicled his experiences in his essay titled, "The Handicapped - by one of them", considered a foundational work in disability studies. At age 23, he won a scholarship to study at Columbia University, from which he graduated in 1912 with a Bachelor of Arts degree and a Master's degree in 1913. He was a journalist and editor of the Columbia Monthly, and he was also a contributor to the weekly The New Republic since it was first launched in 1914, but after America entered the war, the magazine found his pacifist views incompatible. From 1913 to 1914, he studied in Europe on a Columbia Fellowship.

World War I divided American progressives and pitted an anti-war faction—including Bourne and Jane Addams—against a pro-war faction led by pragmatist philosopher and educational theorist John Dewey. Bourne was a student of Dewey's at Columbia, but he rejected Dewey's idea of using the war to spread democracy. (He was a member of the Boar's Head Society.) In his pointedly titled 1917 essay "Twilight of Idols", he invoked the progressive pragmatism of Dewey's contemporary William James to argue that America was using democracy as an end to justify the war, but that democracy itself was never examined. Although initially following Dewey, he felt that Dewey had betrayed his democratic ideals by focusing only on the facade of a democratic government rather than on the ideas behind democracy that Dewey had once professed to respect.

Bourne was greatly influenced by Horace Kallen's 1915 essay, "Democracy Versus the Melting-Pot". Like Kallen, Bourne argued that Americanism ought not to be associated with Anglo-Saxonism. In his 1916 article "Trans-National America," Bourne argued that the United States should accommodate immigrant cultures into a "cosmopolitan America," instead of forcing immigrants to assimilate to the dominant Anglo-Saxon-based culture.

Bourne was an enthusiast for Jean-Jacques Rousseau's belief in the necessity of a general will. Bourne once exclaimed,

Bourne died in the Spanish flu pandemic after the war, in 1918. John Dos Passos, an influential American modernist writer, eulogized Bourne in the chapter "Randolph Bourne" of his novel 1919 and drew heavily on the ideas presented in War Is The Health of the State in the novel.

"Trans-National America" 
In this article, Bourne rejects the melting-pot theory and does not see immigrants assimilating easily to another culture. Bourne's view of nationality was related to the connection between a person and their “spiritual country,” that is, their culture. He argued that people would most often hold tightly to the literature and culture of their native country even if they lived in another. He also believed this was true for the many immigrants to the United States. Therefore, Bourne could not see immigrants from all different parts of the world assimilating to the Anglo-Saxon traditions, which were viewed as American traditions.

This article goes on to say that America offers a unique liberty of opportunity and can still offer traditional isolation, which he felt could lead to a cosmopolitan enterprise. He felt that with this great mix of cultures and people, America would be able to grow into a trans-national nation, which would have interconnecting cultural fibers with other countries. Bourne felt America would grow more as a country by broadening people's views to include immigrants' ways instead of conforming everyone to the melting-pot ideal. This broadening of people's views would eventually lead to a nation where all who live in it are united, which would inevitably pull the country towards greatness. This article and most of the ideas in it were influenced by World War I, during which the article was written.

Published Books 

Youth and Life. 1913. Houghton Mifflin Company. Essays. 
The Gary Schools. 1916. Riverside Press. Detailed overview of the progressive schools in Gary, Indiana.
Untimely Papers. 1919. Posthumous essays mostly about WW1.  Contains the unfinished essay on the State. ("War is the Health of the State").   B. W. Huebsch.

References

Notes

External links

 
 
 
 Works by Randolph Bourne at the Fair Use Repository
 Bourne's obituary, from The New Republic (1919-01-04), by Floyd Dell

American male essayists
Columbia College (New York) alumni
People from Bloomfield, New Jersey
1886 births
1918 deaths
Deaths from the Spanish flu pandemic in New York (state)
American anti–World War I activists
20th-century American essayists
20th-century American male writers
Progressive Era in the United States
Columbia Graduate School of Arts and Sciences alumni